Francis Xavier Osamu Mizobe (フランシスコ・ザビエル溝部脩), S.D.B. (March 5, 1935 – February 29, 2016) was a Roman Catholic bishop.

Mizobe was ordained to the priesthood on February 9, 1964. He served as Bishop of the Roman Catholic Diocese of Sendai, Japan from 2000 to 2005 and as Bishop of the Roman Catholic Diocese of Takamatsu from 2005 to 2011.

Notes

External links

1935 births
2016 deaths
21st-century Roman Catholic bishops in Japan
Japanese Roman Catholic bishops